

Events
January 21 – Mozart holds a rehearsal of his new opera Cosi fan Tutte in the presence of his friends Joseph Haydn and Michael Puchberg; it is premiered on January 26 at the Burgtheater in Vienna with libretto by Lorenzo Da Ponte.
September 25 – The 'Four Great Anhui Troupes' bring Hui opera, or what becomes called Huiju, to Beijing for the birthday of the Qianlong Emperor. This is effectively the birth of the Beijing opera.
September 28 – Death of music patron Prince Nikolaus Esterházy, following which his son disbands his orchestra and the players disperse.
December 26 – Joseph Haydn and Ludwig van Beethoven meet for the first time, in Bonn.
 Georg Joseph Vogler brings his invention, the orchestrion, to London.
 August Duranowski becomes leader of the Brussels opera orchestra.

Opera
Francesco Bianchi – La vendetta di Nino
Carl Ditters von Dittersdorf 
Das rote Käppchen, Kr.298, premiered May 26
Der Teufel als Hydraulikus
Étienne Méhul – Euphrosine et Corradin ou le Tyran corrigé
Wolfgang Amadeus Mozart – Così fan tutte 
Giovanni Paisiello 
Nina (libretto by Giambattista Lorenzi)
Zenobia in Palmira, R.1.81
William Shield – Hartford Bridge

Classical music
Ludwig van Beethoven – Cantata on the Death of Joseph II
Bartolomeo Campagnoli – Flute Concertos Op. 3
Muzio Clementi – Keyboard Sonata in F, WoO 3
Johann Ladislaus Dussek – Piano Trio
Felice Giardini – 6 Quartets, Op. 25
Joseph Haydn – String Quartets, Op. 64, "Tost", Sonata Hob. XVI No. 49 in E-flat major
Johann Nepomuk Hummel – Piano Quartet in D major
Leopold Kozeluch – Clarinet Concerto in E-flat major
Wolfgang Amadeus Mozart
String Quartet No.22 in B-flat major, K.589
String Quartet No.23 in F major, K.590
String Quintet No.5 in D major, K.593
Adagio and Allegro in F minor for a Mechanical Organ, K.594
Maria Hester Park – 2 Keyboard Sonatas, Op.4
Claus Schall – Concerto No. 4 for violin and orchestra in D major
Christoph Ernst Friedrich Weyse – Piano Sonata No.5 in E major
Paul Wranitzky – Symphony in C major, 'Hungarian'

Published popular music
James Hook – "Rosy Hannah"
Franz Xaver Partsch – 12 Lieder für das schöne Geschlecht, mit Melodien (Prague)
The Apollonian Harmony, Vol.2 (London: Button Whitaker's Music Warehouse), including "Epitaph" by William Boyce

Methods and theory writings 

 Johann Georg Albrechtsberger – Gründliche Anweisung zur Composition

Births
 February 11 – Ignaz Assmayer, composer (d. 1862)
 February 16 – Chretien Urhan, composer
 March 15 – Nicola Vaccai, composer
 May 12 – Carsten Hauch, lyricist (died 1872)
 June 21 – Wilhelm Speyer, composer (died 1878)
 July 23 – Anna Sofia Sevelin, alto
 October 10 – Georg Gerson, composer (d. 1825)
 October 17 – August Ferdinand Anacker, composer (d. 1854)
 October 30 – Karol Lipiński, violinist and composer (d. 1861)
 November 7 – Luigi Legnani, guitarist and composer (d. 1877)
 November 11 – Joseph Kreutzer, violinist, conductor and composer (d. 1840)
date unknown
Ghanam Krishna Iyer, Carnatic music composer (d. 1854)
Anna Maria Sessi, opera singer (d. 1864)

Deaths
January 25 – Giusto Fernando Tenducci, composer and castrato singer (born c.1736)
February 14 – Capel Bond, composer, 59
 February 19 – Jean-Baptiste Krumphultz, composer, 47 (suicide by drowning)
February 20 – Emperor Joseph II, 48
 February 21 – Johann Friedrich Kloffler, conductor and composer, 64
May 24 – François-Henri Clicquot, organ builder, 57/58
 June 25 – Lovisa Augusti, opera singer, 33
September 3 – Thomas Norris, composer
September 28 – Prince Nikolaus Esterházy, patron of Joseph Haydn
December 16 – Ludwig August Lebrun, composer, 38
date unknown
Simoni Dall Croubelis, composer
Pietro Denis, mandolin virtuoso (born 1720)
Lucile Grétry, composer, 18 
Johann Georg Röllig, composer (born 1710)

References

 
18th century in music
Music by year